George Morris Simpson (7 May 1840 – 22 August 1919) was an Australian politician.

He was born in Sydney to George Thorant Simpson, an accountant, and Ruth Francis. Brought up by long-serving New South Wales politician Sir John Hay, he attended Sydney Grammar School before moving to Queensland to farm. On 10 November 1875 he married Emily Ellen Vaughan Jenkins, with whom he would have nine children. He was elected to the Queensland Legislative Assembly in 1878 as the member for Dalby, and he served until 1882. He was also a candidate for the New South Wales seat of New England at the first federal election.

Simpson died in 1919 in Sydney and was buried at Waverley Cemetery.

References

1849 births
1919 deaths
Members of the Queensland Legislative Assembly
Politicians from Sydney